Henry Bufford may refer to:
John Henry Bufford (1810–1870), American lithographer
Joseph Henry Bufford (1854–1923), American politician from Mississippi